The Blue is a South Korean musical duo formed in 1992. The duo consists of Son Ji-chang and Kim Min-jong. They were playing leads in hit dramas at the time, and enjoyed explosive popularity among women when they debuted with ballads and dance music. They went their separate ways for a while after their first album, but reunited in 1995 for a second project and produced many chart-toppers.

Discography

Album
 1st The Blue – New Release (1992)
 The Blue (1995)

EP
 The Blue – The First Memories (2009)

References

South Korean boy bands
South Korean musical duos
Musical groups disestablished in 2014